A backpack is a cloth sack carried on one's back and secured with straps.

Backpack may also refer to:

Part of some sorts of equipment (e.g. breathing sets, flamethrowers) which is carried on the back
"Backpack", a song from Justin Bieber album Journals
Plymouth Backpack, a concept car
Backpack, a character in Dora the Explorer
Badge Backpack, a repository for collecting and displaying digital badges from a variety of sources